Indonesia is scheduled to compete at the 2017 World Aquatics Championships in Budapest, Hungary from 14 July to 30 July.

Swimming

Indonesian swimmers have achieved qualifying standards in the following events (up to a maximum of 2 swimmers in each event at the A-standard entry time, and 1 at the B-standard):

Men

Women

References

Nations at the 2017 World Aquatics Championships
Indonesia at the World Aquatics Championships
2017 in Indonesian sport